Chase Paymentech is a payment processing and merchant acquiring business of JPMorgan Chase (NYSE: JPM). Paymentech payment platforms supports businesses to process payments. Paymentech authorises payment transactions in more than 130 currencies. In addition to this, the company provides business analytics, payment fraud detection, and data security solutions.

In 2012, Chase Paymentech processed 29.5 billion transactions with a value of $655.2 billion.

History
1985: MNET, MBank's retail unit and merchant acquirer, was founded.

1987: Acquired by Lomas Bank Corp.

1989: Becomes First USA Merchant Services.

1996: Paymentech brand created and IPO executed.

1997: Chase Merchant Services created as a joint venture between Chase and FDC.

1997: First USA acquired by Bank One. 

1999: FDC acquires shares of Paymentech; merges with Bank One Payment Services.

2002: Acquires Scotiabank and Citibank CA merchant acquiring portfolio.

2004: European expansion begins; Dublin, Ireland location opens.

2004: Bank One merges with JPMorgan Chase.

2005: Paymentech integrates with Chase Merchant Services.

2008: FDC and JPMorgan announce Paymentech joint venture to end.

2008: Chase Paymentech becomes the Merchant Services subsidiary of JPMorgan Chase.

Early history 
The company expanded by first acquiring JL McKay, a credit card software provider. The expansions continued with further acquisition of Litle and DMGT in 1995. The brand Paymentech was created in the year 1996 and the IPO was executed in the same year. Paymentech acquired Gensar, which later became Paymentech Network Services, Tampa, and Merchant Link in 1996.

In 1997, Chase Paymentech was created as a joint venture between Chase Merchant Services and First Data Corporation (FDC). That year, First USA was acquired by Bank One. In 2001, Paymentech completed the largest retail merchant conversion and launched its Orbital Gateway. In 2002, Chase Paymentech acquired the merchant acquiring portfolios of Scotiabank and Citibank CA.

Chase Paymentech opened its first European office in Dublin, Ireland in 2004. That year also saw the merger of Bank One and JPMorgan Chase. In 2008, FDC and JPMorgan announced that their Chase Paymentech joint venture was coming to an end, and Chase Paymentech became the merchant services subsidiary of JPMorgan Chase Bank, N.A.

Products and services
Chase Paymentech provides electronic payment processing products for businesses that accept credit, debit or gift cards from their customers. Their product portfolio includes products to help merchants reduce payment fraud and manage chargebacks. The company offers products aimed at multiple industry verticals, including e-commerce, retail, professional services, travel and lodging, restaurant, digital content, and government.

In June 2012, the firm announced the launch of their “future proof” payment terminals, which allows small businesses to accept current payment types, as well as the flexibility to accept emerging forms of customer payments, such as mobile wallets and contactless payment technologies.

Mobile payment processing
The firm offers products for merchants and small business owners to take payments in real time on mobile devices. Their Chase Mobile Checkout product, launched in May 2013, allows businesses to accept credit and debit cards via smartphone with their mobile app and card reader.

Point of sale equipment
The firm provides payment terminals and PC services for credit card acceptance at point of sale.  Some of the company’s products include ,  XD2100SP Wireless, Hypercom T7Plus Series, Hypercom Optimum T4205, Hyp Ingenico 7780, VeriFone V 610 Wireless, VeriFone V 570 Dual Comm, VeriFone V 510 Dual Comm, and ECRi (Electronic Cash Register interface).

Cyber Holiday Pulse Index
Every year, Chase Paymentech releases the Cyber Holiday Pulse Index, an annual measurement of online shopping activity during the holiday season, which tracks e-commerce spending across a sample of 50 leading e-retailers. The Index shows both sales volume and transaction count for online purchases across Chase Paymentech's global processing platforms.

References

Companies based in Dallas
American companies established in 1985
Financial services companies established in 1985
Payment service providers
1985 establishments in Texas